Adolphe Benedict Hayum Goldschmidt (1838, Frankfurt – 6 April 1918, London) was co-inheritor of the Goldschmidt family bank in Frankfurt am Main, Germany.

Life 
His father was Benedikt Hayum Goldschmidt, founder of the bank  and consul to the Grand Duke of Tuscany. One of the richest families in Europe, in 1900, after their father's death, he and his brother, Maximilian decided to close the bank and leave Frankfurt.  While Maximilian, the later Maximilian von Goldschmidt-Rothschild, moved to Berlin, Adolphe went first to Paris and then to London, where he bought a large house in Mayfair. He also bought a 2,500 acre (10 km2) country estate in Suffolk. Adolphe and his wife became collectors of art. They acquired many expensive pieces including the furniture of Louis XV and Louis XVI.

Adolphe did not want to go back into banking, but he became a sleeping partner in London Merchant Bank °Helbert Wagg & Co.° (estab. 1848, 1962 acquired by °Schroders°) and invested in bonds. He also held interests in the Central Mining Investment Corp., which controlled mines in South Africa and had interests in the De Beers diamond and oil business.

Adolphe was the father of Conservative politician Frank Goldsmith, who anglicized his name to "Goldsmith", and grandfather of both tycoon James Goldsmith and environmentalist Edward Goldsmith. Adolphe's descendants are Zac and Jemima Goldsmith.

References

19th-century German Jews
1838 births
1918 deaths
Adolphe
People from Frankfurt
German bankers
German art collectors
19th-century art collectors
20th-century art collectors